Phrynobatrachus perpalmatus is a species of frog in the family Phrynobatrachidae. It is found in the area stretching from the central and southern Sudan southward through South Sudan and central/eastern  Democratic Republic of the Congo, extreme western Tanzania, Burundi, Malawi, and Zambia to northern Mozambique; its range might extend into northern Zimbabwe. Common names Lake Mwero river frog and webbed puddle frog have been proposed for it.

Description
The body is elongated but short. The snout is rounded. The finger tips are not dilated whereas the toe tips bear small discs; the toes are fully or almost fully webbed. The dorsum is brown and may have a light vertebral stripe. Black, pale-edged bands run from behind the eyes to the groin. Males have a subgular vocal sac that is unpigmented or has black speckling.

The male advertisement call is metallic clicking or a very coarse croak.

Habitat and conservation
It has particular affinity to flooded grassland interspersed with reeds, its presumed breeding habitat.

Phrynobatrachus perpalmatus can be locally very abundant, but its distribution tends to be patchy. Believed to be able to survive in wet areas in agricultural land (including rice paddies), it is probably adaptable and not facing other than localized threats. It is present in a number of protected areas.

Notes

References

perpalmatus
Frogs of Africa
Amphibians of Burundi
Amphibians of the Democratic Republic of the Congo
Amphibians of Malawi
Amphibians of Mozambique
Vertebrates of South Sudan
Vertebrates of Sudan
Amphibians of Tanzania
Amphibians of Zambia
Taxa named by George Albert Boulenger
Amphibians described in 1898
Taxonomy articles created by Polbot